A boum/boom, known as dhangi in India, is a medium-sized deep-sea dhow, a traditional Arabic sailing vessel.

This type of dhow has two masts with lateen sails, a stern that is tapering in shape and a more symmetrical overall structure than other dhow types. The Arab boum has a very high prow, which is trimmed in the Indian version.

History
The boum replaced the heavier baghlahs and ghanjahs which were more difficult to maneuver. Booms were mainly built in Beypore, Konkan and Gujarat, India, and Kuwait and are primarily used along the coasts of the Arabian Peninsula, Sindh, the west coast of the Indian Subcontinent, and East Africa.

Nowadays some Booms have been converted into motorboats after being fitted with engines instead of sails, especially in the Persian Gulf area.
A boum in full sail is represented in the Emblem of Kuwait, emphasizing its traditional importance in the country, where it was used to carry fresh water and in the pearl industry, as well as a trading ship.

See also
Kuwait Scientific Center
Uru (boat)
Ghanjah
Shu'ai

References

Further reading 
Clifford W. Hawkins, The dhow: an illustrated history of the dhow and its world.

External links

Kuwait boum

Dhow types
Sailing ships
Arab inventions
Tall ships